Ulf Karlsen (born 8 March 1966) is a retired Norwegian football defender.

Ahead of the 1988 season he transferred from Mo IL to Bryne FK, moving on to neighbors Viking FK in 1991. That year, Viking became league champions. Karlsen was also capped three times for Norway.

He retired after the 1997 season and instead entered Viking FK's board of directors.

References

1966 births
Living people
People from Rana, Norway
Norwegian footballers
Bryne FK players
Viking FK players
Norwegian First Division players
Eliteserien players
Association football defenders
Norway international footballers
Sportspeople from Nordland